The IWA Women's Championship (Spanish: "Campeonato Mundial de la División Femenina de la IWA" in Spanish) is a women's professional wrestling championship promoted by the International Wrestling Association (IWA) promotion in Puerto Rico, basically was the women's championship of International Wrestling Association (IWA).

The championship is generally contested in professional wrestling matches, in which participants execute scripted finishes rather than contend in direct competition.

History 
On March 31, 2007 during the live event "La Sexta Extinción" at Bayamon, Puerto Rico, Hector "Voz de Trueno" Meléndez introduced the new Championship and the rules to Crown the inaugural champion via a tournament. The wrestlers announced were: La Morena, Sweet Nancy, Killer Kat, Amazona, Black Rose and Sexy Juliette. The tournament Started on April 14, 2007 during the event "Victor Quiñonez Memorial" with a Battle royal to determine the brackets of the tournament, the winner of the match was Sexy Juliette who advanced to the next round.

On July 26, 2018, the reactivation of the Women's Championship was announced as part of a relaunch of the IWA Florida branch. The title's vacancy is to be filled in a tournament along the Undisputed World Heavyweight and World Tag Team Championships.

Inaugural Tournament

Title history

Combined Reigns

References 

International Wrestling Association (Puerto Rico) championships
Women's professional wrestling championships